This is a list of films produced by the Ollywood film industry based in Bhubaneshwar and Cuttack in 2012:

A-Z

References

2012
Ollywood
2010s in Odisha
Ollywood